John Wilson  (5 November 158619 February 1635) was an eminent Anglican priest in the first half of the  17th century.

Wilson was educated at Christ Church, Oxford He was Headmaster of Westminster School from 1610 to 1622; the incumbent at Bedale, Burneston then St Mary's Church, Castlegate, York; a canon of Westminster and Lincoln from 1623; and Dean of Ripon from 1624; and Master of the Savoy from 1629.

References

1586 births
Alumni of Christ Church, Oxford
Deans of Ripon
1635 deaths
Masters of the Savoy
Head Masters of Westminster School